George Town Inner Ring Road is an urban ring road within the city of George Town in Penang, Malaysia. It comprises the eastern end of Gurney Drive, Jalan Pangkor, Jalan Perak and Jalan Sungai Pinang, forming a loop containing the city centre. Both the old and new Central Business Districts of the city, as well as its UNESCO World Heritage Site, are located within the loop.

The ring road serves to alleviate traffic congestion by acting as a bypass between the northern coast of George Town and the Tun Dr Lim Chong Eu Expressway to the southeast. Whilst the ring road is presently formed by municipal roads, infrastructural plans have been drawn up to turn the roads into a proper expressway, including the construction of elevated bypasses and a tunnel.

List of interchanges

See also 
 Tun Dr Lim Chong Eu Expressway
 Transport in Penang

References 

Roads in Penang
Expressways and highways in Penang
Ring roads in Malaysia